Borisov, or the female form Borisova, is a Bulgarian and Russian surname. It is derived from the male given name Boris and literally means Boris's. Notable people with the name include:

Borisov 
Alexei Borisov (born 1960), Russian musician 
Alexey Borisov (1965–2021), Russian mathematician, Kovalevskaya Prize winner (2012)
Aleksandr Borisov (disambiguation) 
Andrey Borisov (born 1990), Russian blogger and actor
Arkady Borisov (1901–1942), Soviet corps commander
Boris Borisov (born 1978), Bulgarian footballer
Boris Borisov (actor) (1872–1939), Russian actor
Borislav Borisov (disambiguation)
Boyko Borisov (born 1959), three times prime minister of Bulgaria
Deyan Borisov (born 1989), Bulgarian footballer
Dmitri Borisov (disambiguation) 
Eduard Borisov (born 1934), a Soviet boxer
Evgeniy Borisov (born 1984), Russian hurdler
Fyodor Borisov (1892–?), Russian cyclist
Georgi Borisov (born 1975), Bulgarian football player
Gennadiy Borisov (born 1962), Crimean telescope maker and astronomer, after whom 2I/Borisov and C/2014 Q3 (Borisov) are named 
Igor Borisov (1924–2003), Russian rower
Ivan Borisov (disambiguation) 
Krasimir Borisov (born 1950), Bulgarian footballer
Lev Borisov (1933–2011), Russian actor
Maxim Borisov (born 1995), Russian table hockey player
Miloš Borisov (born 1985), Montenegrin basketball player 
Nikita Borisov (born 1977), cryptographer and computer security researcher
Oleg Borisov (1929–1994), Soviet actor and People's Artist of the USSR
Oleksiy Borysov (fl. 2012), Ukrainian sailor, later known as Aleksey Borisov 
Roman Borisov (born 1981), Russian footballer
Sergey Borisov (disambiguation)
Vadim Borisov (born 1955), Russian tennis player
Valeriy Borisov (born 1966), Kazakhstani race walker
Valery Borisov (disambiguation)
Vasily Borisov (1922–2003), Soviet rifle shooter
Veniamin Borisov (1935–2014), Russian painter
Victor Borisov (1937–2013), Russian physicist and mathematician
Victor Borisov-Musatov (1870–1905), Russian painter
Viktor Borisov (born 1985), Russian footballer
Vitaliy Borisov (born 1982), Azerbaijani futsal player
Vladimir Borisov (1902–1941), Soviet general
Vladislav Borisov (disambiguation)
Vyacheslav Borisov (born 1955), Russian general who commanded troops in the 2008 South Ossetian War
Yasen Borisov (born 1962), Bulgarian badminton player
Yegor Borisov (born 1954), Russian politician and former prime minister of Sakha Republic
Yuri Borisov (disambiguation) 
Peter and Andrei Borisov, participants in the Decembrist revolt in Russia, 1925

Borisova 
Albina Borisova (born 1952), Yakut writer 
 Anna Borisova, pen name of Grigori Chkhartishvili (born 1956), Russian-Georgian writer
 Borislava Borisova (born 1951), Bulgarian and Swedish chess master
Diana Borisova (born 1997), Russian rhythmic gymnast
Ekaterina Borisova (born 1999), Russian pair skater
 Lyudmila Borisova (born 1966), Russian middle-distance runner
Maria Borisova (born 1997), Russian water polo player
Sanya Borisova (born 1983), Bulgarian actress
 Verka Borisova (born 1955), Bulgarian volleyball player
 Tatyana Borisova (born 1975), Kyrgyzstani middle-distance runner
 Yuliya Borisova (born 1925), Russian actress

See also

Bulgarian-language surnames
Russian-language surnames
Patronymic surnames
Surnames from given names